Bob Hewitt and Fred Stolle were the defending champions, but lost in the third round to Michael Hann and Roger Taylor.

Rafael Osuna and Antonio Palafox defeated Jean-Claude Barclay and Pierre Darmon in the final, 4–6, 6–2, 6–2, 6–2 to win the gentlemen's doubles tennis title at the 1963 Wimbledon Championship.

Seeds

  Bob Hewitt /  Fred Stolle (third round)
  Roy Emerson /  Manuel Santana (semifinals)
  Chuck McKinley /  Dennis Ralston (fourth round)
  Boro Jovanović /  Nikola Pilić (fourth round)

Draw

Finals

Top half

Section 1

Section 2

Section 3

Section 4

Bottom half

Section 5

Section 6

Section 7

Section 8

References

External links

Men's Doubles
Wimbledon Championship by year – Men's doubles